Kyé-Ossi is a commune in the South Province of Cameroon, located in the department of Vallée-du-Ntem.  The commune is located immediately on Cameroon's borders with Gabon and Equatorial Guinea.

Population 
The 2005 census recorded 17,127 inhabitants.

References

Populated places in South Region (Cameroon)
Communes of Cameroon
Cameroon–Equatorial Guinea border crossings
Cameroon–Gabon border crossings